AC power plugs and sockets connect electric equipment to the alternating current (AC) mains electricity power supply in buildings and at other sites. Electrical plugs and sockets differ from one another in voltage and current rating, shape, size, and connector type. Different standard systems of plugs and sockets are used around the world.

Plugs and sockets for portable appliances became available in the 1880s, to replace connections to light sockets with wall-mounted outlets. A proliferation of types developed for both convenience and protection from electrical injury. Today there are about 20 types in common use around the world, and many obsolete socket types are found in older buildings. Coordination of technical standards has allowed some types of plug to be used across large regions to facilitate trade in electrical appliances, and for the convenience of travellers and consumers of imported electrical goods.

Some multi-standard sockets allow use of several types of plug; improvised or unapproved adaptors between incompatible sockets and plugs may not provide the full safety and performance of an approved socket-plug combination.

Concepts and terminology

A plug is the movable connector attached to an electrically operated device, and the socket is fixed on equipment or a building structure and connected to an energised electrical circuit. The plug is a male connector, often with protruding pins that match the openings and female contacts in a socket. Some plugs have female contacts that are used only for an earth ground connection. Some plugs have built-in fuses for safety.

To reduce the risk of electric shock, plug and socket systems have safety features in addition to the recessed contacts of the energised socket. 

A socket may be surrounded by a decorative or protective cover which may be integral with the socket.

Single-phase sockets have two current-carrying connections to the power supply circuit, and may also have a third pin for a safety connection to earth ground. Depending on the supply system, one or both current-carrying connections may have significant voltage to earth ground.

History

When commercial electric power was first introduced in the 1880s, it was used primarily for lighting. Other portable appliances (such as vacuum cleaners, electric fans, smoothing irons, and curling-tong heaters) were connected to light-bulb sockets.

As early as 1885 a two-pin plug and wall socket format was available on the British market. By about 1910 the first three-pin earthed (grounded) plugs appeared. Over time other safety improvements were gradually introduced to the market. The earliest national standard for plug and wall socket forms was set in 1915.

Application issues

Protection from accidental contact
Designs of plugs and sockets have gradually developed to reduce the risk of electric shock and fire. Plugs are shaped to prevent finger contact with live parts. Sockets may be recessed and plugs designed to fit closely within the recess to reduce risk of a user's fingers contacting the live pins. Contact pins may be sheathed with insulation over part of their length, so as to reduce exposure of energized metal during insertion or removal of the socket. Sockets may have automatic shutters to stop foreign objects from being inserted into energized contacts. Some types can also include fuses and switches.

Earthing (grounding)
A third contact for a connection to earth is intended to protect against insulation failure of the connected device. Some early unearthed plug and socket types were revised to include an earthing pin or phased out in favour of earthed types. The plug is often designed so that the earth ground contact connects before the energized circuit contacts.

The assigned IEC appliance class is governed by the requirement for earthing or equivalent protection. Class I equipment requires an earth contact in the plug and socket, while Class II equipment is unearthed and protects the user with double insulation.

Polarisation

Where a "neutral" conductor exists in supply wiring, polarisation of the plug can improve safety by preserving the distinction in the equipment. For example, appliances may ensure that switches interrupt the line side of the circuit, or can connect the shell of a screw-base lampholder to neutral to reduce electric shock hazard. In some designs, polarised plugs cannot be mated with non-polarised sockets. Wiring systems where both circuit conductors have a significant potential with respect to earth do not benefit from polarised plugs.

Universal sockets
"Universal" or "multi-standard" sockets are intended to accommodate plugs of various types. In some jurisdictions, they violate safety standards for sockets.

Safety advocates, the United States Army, and a manufacturer of sockets point out a number of safety issues with universal socket and adapters, including voltage mismatch, exposure of live pins, lack of proper earth ground connection, or lack of protection from overload or short circuit. Universal sockets may not meet technical standards for durability, plug retention force, temperature rise of components, or other performance requirements, as they are outside the scope of national and international technical standards.

A technical standard may include compatibility of a socket with more than one form of plug. The Thai dual socket is specified in figure 4 of TIS 166-2549 and is designed to accept Thai plugs, and also Type A, B, and C plugs. Chinese dual sockets have both an unearthed socket complying with figure 5 of GB 1002-2008 (both flat pin and 4.8 mm round pin), and an earthed socket complying with figure 4 of GB 1002-2008. Both Thai and Chinese dual sockets also physically accept plugs normally fitted to 120 V appliances (e.g. 120 V rated NEMA 1-15 ungrounded plugs). This can cause an electrical incompatibility, since both states normally supply residential power only at 220 V.

Voltage rating of plugs and power cords

Plugs and power cords have a rated voltage and current assigned to them by the manufacturer. Using a plug or power cord that is inappropriate for the load may be a safety hazard. For example, high-current equipment can cause a fire when plugged into an extension cord with a current rating lower than necessary. Sometimes the cords used to plug in dual voltage 120 V / 240 V equipment are rated only for 125 V, so care must be taken by travellers to use only cords with an appropriate voltage rating.

Appliance connections and extensions

So that manufacturers need not build many similar appliances differing only in the type of plug fitted, a common strategy is to provide an IEC 60320 inlet on the appliance and a detachable power cord (mains flex lead) and appropriate plug. The appliance need only to be tested to the power inlet. Some appliances have a switch for selection of voltage. 

Extension cords (extension leads) are used for temporary connections when a socket is not within convenient reach of an appliance's power lead. A power strip with multiple sockets may also have a switch, surge voltage protection, or over-current protection.

Special purpose plugs and sockets
Special purpose sockets may be found in residential, industrial, commercial or institutional buildings. Examples of systems using special purpose sockets include:
 "Clean" (low electrical noise) earth for use with computer systems,
 Emergency power supply,
 Uninterruptible power supply for critical or life-support equipment,
 Isolated power for medical instruments, tools used in wet conditions, or electric razors,
 "Balanced" or "technical" power used in audio and video production studios,
 Theatrical lighting,
 IEC 60309 (CEE 17) "plugs, socket-outlets and couplers for industrial purposes", used as a weather-resistant connector for Caravans, Motorhomes, camper vans and tents for mains hook-up at camp-sites.
 Sockets for electric clothes dryers, electric ovens, and air conditioners with higher current rating.

Special-purpose sockets may be labelled or coloured to identify a reserved use of a system, or may have keys or specially shaped pins to prevent use of unintended equipment.

Shaver supply units

National wiring regulations sometimes prohibit the use of sockets adjacent to water taps, etc. A special socket, with an isolation transformer, may allow electric razors to be used near a sink. Because the isolation transformer is of low rating, such outlets are not suitable to operate higher-powered appliances such as hair dryers.

An IEC standard 61558-2-5, adopted by CENELEC and as a national standard in some countries, describes one type of shaver supply unit. Shaver sockets may accept multiple two-pin plug types including Europlug (Type C), Australian (Type I) and BS 4573. The isolation transformer often includes a 115 V output accepting two-pin US plugs (Type A). Shaver supply units must also be current limited, IEC 61558-2-5 specifies a minimum rating of 20 VA and maximum of 50 VA. Sockets are marked with a shaver symbol, and may also say "shavers only."

Isolation transformers and dedicated NEMA 1-15 shaver receptacles were once standard installation practice in North America, but now a GFCI receptacle is used instead. This provides the full capacity of a standard receptacle but protects the user of a razor or other appliance from leakage current.

Types in present use

The plugs and sockets used in a given area are regulated by local governments.

The International Electrotechnical Commission (IEC) maintains a guide with letter designations for generally compatible types of plugs, which expands on earlier guides published by the United States Department of Commerce. This is a de facto naming standard and guide to travellers. Some letter types correspond to several current ratings or different technical standards, so the letter does not uniquely identify a plug and socket within the type family, nor guarantee compatibility. Physical compatibility of the plug and socket does not ensure correct voltage, frequency, or current capacity. Not all plug and socket families have letters in the IEC guide, but those that have are noted in this article, as are some additional letters commonly used by retail vendors.

In Europe, CENELEC publishes a list of approved plug and socket technical standards used in the member countries.

Argentina IRAM 2073 and 2071 (Type I)

The plug and socket system used in Class 1 applications in Argentina is defined by IRAM standards. These two standards are; IRAM 2073 "Two pole plugs with earthing contact for domestic and similar purposes, rated 10 A and 20 A, 250 V AC" and IRAM 2071 "Two pole socket – outlets with earthing contact for 10 A and 20 A, 250 V AC., for fixed installations." The plug and socket system is similar in appearance to the Australian and Chinese plugs. It has an earthing pin and two flat current-carrying pins forming an inverted V-shape (120°). The pin length is the same as in the Chinese version.

The most important difference from the Australian plug is that the Argentinian plug is wired with the live and neutral contacts reversed.

In Brazil, similar plugs and sockets are still commonly used in old installations for high-power appliances like air conditioners, dishwashers, and household ovens. Although being often called "Argentinian plug," it is actually based on the American NEMA 10-20 standard, and is incompatible with Argentinian IRAM plugs. Since Brazil adopted the NBR 14136 standard which includes a 20 A version, the original motivation to use the NEMA 10-20 plug has ceased to exist.

Australian/New Zealand standard AS/NZS 3112 (Type I), used in Australasia 

This Australian/New Zealand standard is used in Australia, New Zealand, Fiji, Tonga, Solomon Islands, and Papua New Guinea. It defines a plug with an earthing pin, and two flat current-carrying pins which form an inverted V-shape. Australian and New Zealand wall sockets (locally often referred to as power points) almost always have switches on them for extra safety, as in the UK. An unearthed version of this plug with two angled power pins but no earthing pin is used with double-insulated appliances, but the sockets always include an earth contact.

There are several AS/NZS 3112 plug variants, including ones with larger or differently shaped pins used for devices drawing 15, 20, 25 and 32 A. These sockets accept plugs of equal or lower current rating, but not higher. For example, a 10 A plug will fit all sockets but a 20 A plug will fit only 20, 25 and 32 A sockets. In New Zealand, PDL 940 "tap-on" or "piggy-back" plugs are available which allow a second 10 A plug to be fitted to the rear of the plug. In Australia these piggy-back plugs are now available only on pre-made extension leads.

Australia's standard plug/socket system was originally codified as standard C112 (floated provisionally in 1937, and adopted as a formal standard in 1938), which was based on a design patented by Harvey Hubbell and was superseded by AS 3112 in 1990. The requirement for insulated pins was introduced in the 2004 revision. The current version is AS/NZS 3112:2011, Approval and test specification – Plugs and socket-outlets.

Brazilian standard NBR 14136 (Type N) 

Brazil, which had been using mostly Europlugs, and NEMA 1-15 and NEMA 5-15 standards, adopted a (non-compliant) variant of IEC 60906-1 as the national standard in 1998 under specification NBR 14136 (revised in 2002). These are used for both 220-volt and 127-volt regions of the country, despite the IEC 60906-2 recommendation that NEMA 5-15 be used for 120 V connections. There are two types of sockets and plugs in NBR 14136: one for 10 A, with a 4.0 mm pin diameter, and another for 20 A, with a 4.8 mm pin diameter. This differs from IEC 60906-1 which specifies a pin diameter of 4.5 mm and a rating of 16 A. NBR 14136 does not require shutters on the apertures, a further aspect of non-compliance with IEC 60906-1. NBR 14136 was not enforced in that country until 2007, when its adoption was made optional for manufacturers. It became compulsory on 1 January 2010.

Few private houses in Brazil have an earthed supply, so even if a three-pin socket is present it is not safe to assume that all three terminals are actually connected. Most large domestic appliances were sold with the option to fit a flying earth tail to be locally earthed, but many consumers were unsure how to use this and so did not connect it. The new standard has an earth pin, which in theory eliminates the need for the flying earth tail.

British and compatible standards

BS 546 and related types (Type D and M)

BS 546, "Two-pole and earthing-pin plugs, socket-outlets and socket-outlet adaptors for AC (50-60 Hz) circuits up to 250V" describes four sizes of plug rated at 2 A, 5 A (Type D), 15 A (Type M) and 30 A. The plugs have three round pins arranged in a triangle, with the larger top pin being the earthing pin. The plugs are polarised and unfused. Plugs are non-interchangeable between current ratings. Introduced in 1934, the BS 546 type has mostly been displaced in the UK by the BS 1363 standard. According to the IEC, some 40 countries use Type D and 15 countries use Type M. Some, such as India and South Africa, use standards based on BS 546.

BS 1363 (Type G) 

BS 1363 "13 A plugs, socket-outlets, adaptors and connection units" is the main plug and socket type used in the United Kingdom. According to the IEC it is also used in over 50 countries worldwide. Some of these countries have national standards based on BS 1363, including: Ireland, Malaysia, Malta, Singapore, Bahrain, Sri Lanka and Saudi Arabia.

This plug has three rectangular pins forming an isosceles triangle. The BS 1363 plug has a fuse rated to protect its flexible cord from overload and consequent fire risk. Modern appliances may only be sold with a fuse of the appropriate size pre-installed.

BS 4573 (UK shaver)

The United Kingdom, Ireland, and Malta use the BS 4573 two-pin plug and socket for electric shavers and toothbrushes. The plug has insulated sleeves on the pins. Although similar to the Europlug Type C, the diameter and spacing of the pins are slightly different and hence it will not fit into a Schuko socket. There are, however, two-pin sockets and adaptors which will accept both BS 4573 and Europlugs.

CEE 7 standard

The International Commission on the Rules for the Approval of Electrical Equipment (IECEE) was a standards body which published Specification for plugs and socket-outlets for domestic and similar purposes as CEE Publication 7 in 1951. It was last updated by Modification 4 in March 1983. CEE 7 consists of general specifications and standard sheets for specific connectors.

Standard plugs and sockets based on two round pins with centres spaced at 19 mm are in use in Europe, most of which are listed in IEC/TR 60083 "Plugs and socket-outlets for domestic and similar general use standardized in member countries of IEC." EU countries each have their own regulations and national standards; for example, some require child-resistant shutters, while others do not. CE marking is neither applicable nor permitted on plugs and sockets.

CEE 7/1 unearthed socket and CEE 7/2 unearthed plug

CEE 7/1 unearthed sockets accept CEE 7/2 round plugs with  pins. Because they have no earth connections they have been or are being phased out in most countries. Some countries still permit their use in dry areas. Older sockets are so shallow that it is possible to accidentally touch the live pins of a plug. CEE 7/1 sockets also accept CEE 7/4, CEE 7/6 and CEE 7/7 plugs without providing an earth connection. The earthed CEE 7/3 and CEE 7/5 sockets do not allow insertion of CEE 7/2 unearthed round plugs.

CEE 7/3 socket and CEE 7/4 plug (German "Schuko"; Type F)

The CEE 7/3 socket and CEE 7/4 plug are commonly called Schuko, an abbreviation for Schutzkontakt, Protective contact to earth ("Schuko" itself is a registered trademark of a German association established to own the term). The socket has a circular recess with two round holes and two earthing clips that engage before live pin contact is made. The Schuko system is unpolarised, allowing live and neutral to be reversed. The socket accepts Europlugs and CEE 7/17 plugs. It is rated at 16 A. The current German standards are DIN 49441 and DIN 49440. The standard is used in Germany and several other European countries and on other continents. Some countries require child-proof socket shutters; the DIN 49440 standard does not have this requirement.

The plug is used in most countries of Europe, Asia, and Africa, as well as in the countries of Peru, Chile and Uruguay. The few European countries not using it (or not using it predominantly) are Denmark, Switzerland, UK, Italy and Ireland.

CEE 7/5 socket and CEE 7/6 plug (French; Type E)

French standard NF C 61-314 defines the CEE 7/5 socket and CEE 7/6 plug, (and also includes CEE 7/7, 7/16 and 7/17 plugs). The socket has a circular recess with two round holes. The round earth pin projecting from the socket connects before the energized contacts touch. This standard is also used in Belgium, Poland, the Czech Republic, Slovakia and some other countries.

Although the plug is polarised, CEE 7 does not define the placement of the live and neutral and there is no universally observed standard.

CEE 7/2 and 7/4 plugs are not compatible with the CEE 7/5 socket because of the round earthing pin permanently mounted in the socket.

CEE 7/7 plug (compatible with E and F) 
 The CEE 7/7 plug fits in either French or Schuko sockets.
The CEE 7/7 plug has earthing contacts to connect to either the CEE 7/3 socket or the CEE 7/5 socket. It is polarised when used with a French CEE 7/5 socket, but can be inserted two ways into a CEE 7/3 socket. The plug is rated at 16 A. Appliances are sold with non-rewireable CEE 7/7 plugs attached. This plug can be inserted into a Danish Type K socket, but the earth contact will not connect.

CEE 7/16 plugs 
The CEE 7/16 unearthed plug is used for unearthed appliances. It has two round 4 by 19 mm (0.157 by 0.748 in) pins, rated at 2.5 A. There are two variants.

CEE 7/16 Alternative I
Alternative I is a round plug with cutouts to make it compatible with CEE 7/3 and CEE 7/5 sockets. (The similar-appearing CEE 7/17 has larger pins and a higher current rating.) This alternative is seldom used.

CEE 7/16 Alternative II "Europlug" (Type C)

Alternative II, popularly known as the Europlug, is a flat 2.5 A-rated plug defined by Cenelec standard EN 50075 and national equivalents. The Europlug is not rewirable and must be supplied with a flexible cord. It can be inserted in either direction, so line and neutral are connected arbitrarily. To improve contact with socket parts the Europlug has slightly flexible pins which converge toward their free ends.

There is no socket defined to accept only the Europlug. Instead, the Europlug fits a range of sockets in common use in Europe. These sockets, including the CEE 7/1, CEE 7/3 (German/"Schuko"), CEE 7/5 (French). Most Israeli, Swiss, Danish and Italian sockets, were designed to accept pins of various diameters, mainly 4.8 mm, but also 4.0 mm and 4.5 mm, and are usually fed by final circuits with either 10 A or 16 A overcurrent protection devices.

UK shaver sockets are designed to accept BS 4573 shaver plugs while also accepting Europlugs. In this configuration, the connection supply is only rated at 200 mA. It is not permissible within the UK for the shaver socket to be fitted and used for a higher rated current draw than the 200 mA maximum.

The Europlug is also used in the Middle East, Africa, South America, and Asia.

CEE 7/17 unearthed plug

This is a round plug compatible with CEE 7/1, CEE 7/3, and CEE 7/5 sockets. The pins are not sheathed, in contrast to e.g. CEE 7/16 europlugs. It may be rated at either 10 A or 16 A. A typical use is for appliances that exceed the 2.5 A rating of CEE 7/16 europlugs. It may be used for unearthed Class II appliances (and in South Korea for all domestic non-earthed appliances). It is also defined as the Class II plug in Italian standard CEI 23-50.

It is sometimes called a contour plug, because its collar contour follows that of the socket's recess. The collar prevents accidental contact with the non sheathed pins when inserting or removing the plug in a recessed socket.

It can be inserted into Israeli SI 32 with some difficulty. The Soviet GOST 7396 standard includes both the CEE 7/17 and the CEE 7/16 variant II plug.

China GB 2099.1‐2008 and GB 1002‐2008 (Type A & I)

The standard for Chinese plugs and sockets (excluding Hong Kong and Macau) is set out in GB 2099.1‐2008 and GB 1002‐2008. As part of China's commitment for entry into the WTO, the new CPCS (Compulsory Product Certification System) has been introduced, and compliant Chinese plugs have been awarded the CCC Mark by this system. The plug is three wire, earthed, rated at 10 A, 250 V and used for Class 1 applications; a slightly larger 16 A version also exists. The nominal pin dimensions of the 10 A version are: 1.5 mm thick by 6.4 mm wide, the line & neutral are 18 mm long, and the earth is 21 mm long. It is similar to the Australian plug. Many 3 pin sockets in China include a physical lockout preventing access to the active and neutral terminals unless an earth pin (which is slightly longer than the other 2 pins) is entered first. China also uses American/Japanese NEMA 1‐15 sockets and plugs for Class-II appliances; a common socket type that also accepts Europlug (type C) is also defined in GB 1002. The voltage at a Chinese socket of any type is 220 V.

Type I plugs and sockets from different countries have different pin lengths. This means that the uninsulated pins of a Chinese plug may become live while there is still a large enough gap between the faces of the plug and socket to allow a finger to touch the pin.

Danish Section 107-2-D1 earthed (Type K)

This Danish standard plug is described in the Danish Plug Equipment Section 107-2-D1 Standard sheet (SRAF1962/DB 16/87 DN10A-R). The Danish standard provides for sockets to have child-resistant shutters.

The Danish socket will also accept the CEE 7/16 Europlug or CEE 7/17 Schuko-French hybrid plug. CEE 7/4 (Schuko), CEE 7/7 (Schuko-French hybrid), and earthed CEE 7/6 French plugs will also fit into the socket but will not provide an earth connection and may be attached to appliances requiring more than the 13 A maximum rating of the socket.

A variation (standard DK 2-5a) of the Danish plug is for use only on surge protected computer sockets. It fits into the corresponding computer socket and the normal socket, but normal plugs deliberately don't fit into the special computer socket. The plug is often used in companies, but rarely in private homes.

There is a variation for hospital equipment with a rectangular left pin, which is used for life support equipment.

Traditionally all Danish sockets were equipped with a switch to prevent touching live pins when connecting/disconnecting the plug. Today, sockets without switch are allowed, but then it is a requirement that the sockets have a cavity to prevent touching the live pins. The shape of the plugs generally makes it difficult to touch the pins when connecting/disconnecting.

Since the early 1990s earthed sockets have been required in all new electric installations in Denmark. Older sockets need not be earthed, but all sockets, including old installations, must be protected by earth-fault interrupters (HFI or HPFI in Danish) by 1 July 2008.

As of 1 July 2008, wall sockets for French 2-pin, female earth CEE 7/5 are permitted for installations in Denmark. This was done because little electrical equipment sold to private users is equipped with a Danish plug.

CEE 7/3 sockets were not permitted until 15 November 2011. Many international travel adaptor sets sold outside Denmark match CEE 7/16 (Europlug) and CEE 7/7 (Schuko-French hybrid) plugs which can readily be used in Denmark.

IEC 60906-1 (Type N) 

In 1986, the International Electrotechnical Commission published IEC 60906-1, a specification for a plug and socket that look similar, but are not identical, to the Swiss plug and socket. This standard was intended to one day become common for all of Europe and other regions with 230 V mains, but the effort to adopt it as a European Union standard was put on hold in the mid-1990s.

The plug and socket are rated 16 A 250 V AC and are intended for use only on systems having nominal voltages between 200 V and 250 V AC The plug pins are 4.5 mm in diameter, line and neutral are on centres 19 mm apart. The earth pin is offset 3.0 mm. The line pin is on the left when looking at a socket with the earth pin offset down. Shutters over the line and neutral pins are mandatory.

The only country to have officially adopted the standard is South Africa as SANS 164-2.

Brazil developed a plug resembling IEC 60906-1 as the national standard under specification NBR 14136. The NBR 14136 standard has two versions, neither of which has pin dimensions or ratings complying with IEC 60906-1. Use at 125 V is permitted by NBR 14136, which is against the intention of IEC 60906-1.

Israel SI32 (Type H)

The plug defined in SI 32 (IS16A-R) is used only in Israel and in the territories of the West Bank and the Gaza Strip. There are two versions: an older one with flat pins, and a newer one with round pins.

The plug is rated at 16 A. In 1989 the standard was revised, with three round  pins in the same locations designed to allow the socket to accept both older and newer Israeli plugs, and also non-earthed Europlugs (often used in Israel for equipment which does not need to be earthed and does not use more current than the Europlug is rated for). Pre-1989 sockets which accept only old-style plugs have become very rare in Israel.

SI 32 plugs have no sleeve insulation, so when a plug is partially removed its prongs may still be powered although they can be touched by small fingers, metal objects, etc., with a risk of electric shock.

Sockets have a defined polarity; looking at the front, neutral is to the left, earth at the bottom, and line to the right.

Italy (Type L)

Italian plugs and sockets are defined by the standard CEI 23-50 which superseded CEI 23-16. This includes models rated at 10 A and 16 A that differ in contact diameter and spacing (see below for details). Both are symmetrical, allowing the line and neutral contacts to be inserted in either direction. This plug is also commonly used in Chile and Uruguay.
 10 A plugs and socket: Pins which are 4 mm in diameter, the centres spaced 19 mm apart. The 10 A three-pin earthed rear entry plug is designated CEI 23-50 S 11 (there are also two side-entry versions, SPA 11 and SPB 11). The 10 A two-pin unearthed plug is designated CEI 23-50 S 10. The 10 A three-pin earthed socket is designated CEI 23-50 P 11, and the 10 A two-pin unearthed socket is designated CEI 23-50 P 10. Both 10 A sockets also accept CEE 7/16 (Europlugs).
 16 A plug and socket: Pins which are 5 mm in diameter, the centres spaced 26 mm apart. The 16 A three-pin earthed rear entry plug is designated CEI 23-50 S 17 (there are also two side-entry versions, SPA 17 and SPB 17). The 16 A two-pin unearthed plug is designated CEI 23-50 S 16. The 16 A three-pin earthed socket is designated CEI 23-50 P 17, there is not a 16 A two-pin unearthed socket. The 16 A socket used to be referred to as per la forza motrice (for electromotive force, see above) or sometimes (inappropriately) industriale (industrial) or even calore (heat).

The two standards were initially adopted because up to the second half of the 20th century in many regions of Italy electricity was supplied by means of two separate consumer connections – one for powering illumination and one for other purposes – and these generally operated at different voltages, typically 127 V single phase and 220 V single phase (from 3-phase 380 V) or two phase (from 220 V 3-phase). The electricity on the two supplies was separately metered, was sold at different tariffs, was taxed differently and was supplied through separate and different sockets. Even though the two electric lines (and respective tariffs) were gradually unified beginning in the 1960s (the official, but purely theoretical date was the summer of 1974) many houses had dual wiring and two electricity meters for years thereafter; in some zones of Lazio the 127 V network was provided for lighting until 1999. The two gauges for plugs and sockets thus became a de facto standard which is now formalized under CEI 23-50. Some older installations have sockets that are limited to either the 10 A or the 16 A style plug, requiring the use of an adaptor if the other gauge needs to be connected. Numerous cross adaptors were used.

Almost every appliance sold in Italy nowadays is equipped with CEE 7/7 (German/French), CEE 7/16 or CEE 7/17 plugs, but the standard Italian sockets will not accept the first and the third ones since the pins of the CEE 7/7 and CEE 7/17 plugs are thicker (4.8 mm) than the Italian ones (4 mm); besides the pins are not sheathed and forcing them into a linear Italian socket may lead to electric shock. Adaptors are standardized in Italy under CEI 23-57 which can be used to connect CEE 7/7 and CEE 7/17 and plugs to linear CEI 23-50 sockets.

Europlugs are also in common use in Italy; they are standardized under CEI 23-34 S 1 for use with the 10 A socket and can be found fitted to Class II appliances with low current requirement (less than 2.5 A).

The current Italian standards provide for sockets to have child-resistant shutters ("Sicury" patent).

Italian multiple standard sockets

In modern installations in Italy (and in other countries where Type L plugs are used) it is usual to find sockets that can accept more than one standard.

The simplest type, designated CEI 23-50 P 17/11, has a central round hole flanked by two figure-8 shaped holes, allowing the insertion of CEI 23-50 S 10 (Italian 10 A plug unearthed), CEI 23-50 S 11 (Italian 10 A plug earthed), CEI 23-50 S 16 (Italian 16 A plug unearthed), CEI 23-50 S 17 (Italian 16 A plug earthed) and CEE 7/16 (Europlug). The advantage of this socket style is its small, compact face; its drawback is that it accepts neither CEE 7/7 nor CEE 7/17, very commonly found in new appliances sold in Italy. Vimar brand claims to have patented this socket first in 1975 with their Bpresa model; however soon other brands started selling similar products, mostly naming them with the generic term presa bipasso (twin-gauge socket) that is now of common use.

A second, quite common type is called CEI 23-50 P 30 and looks like a Schuko socket, but adds a central earthing hole (optional according to CEI 23-50, but virtually always present). This design can accept CEE 7/4 (German), CEE 7/7 (German/French), CEE 7/16, CEE 7/17 (Konturenstecker, German/French unearthed), CEI 23-50 S 10 and CEI 23-50 S 11 plugs. Its drawback is that it is twice as large as a normal Italian socket, it does not accept 16 A Italian plugs and the price is higher; for those reasons Schuko sockets have been rarely installed in Italy until recent times.

Other types may push compatibility even further. The CEI 23-50 P 40 socket, which is quickly becoming the standard in Italy along with CEI 23-50 P 17/11, accepts CEE 7/4, CEE 7/7, CEE 7/16, CEE 7/17, CEI 23-50 S 10, CEI 23-50 S 11, CEI 23-50 S 16 and CEI 23-50 S 17 plugs; its drawback is that it does not accept SPA 11, SPB 11, SPA 17 and SPB 17 side-entry plugs; however almost no appliance is sold with these types, which are mainly used to replace existing plugs. The Vimar-brand universale (all purpose) socket accepts CEE 7/4, CEE 7/7, CEE 7/16, CEE 7/17, CEI 23-50 S 10, CEI 23-50 S 11, CEI 23-50 S 16, CEI 23-50 S 17 and also NEMA 1-15 (US/Japan) plugs (older versions also had extra holes to accept UK shaver plugs).

North America, Central America and IEC 60906-2 

Most of North America and Central America, and some of South America, use connectors standardized by the National Electrical Manufacturers Association (NEMA). The devices are named using the format NEMA n-mmX, where n is an identifier for the configuration of pins and blades, mm is the maximum current rating, and X is either P for plug or R for receptacle. For example, NEMA 5-15R is a configuration type 5 receptacle supporting 15 A. Corresponding P and R versions are designed to be mated. Within the series, the arrangement and size of pins will differ, to prevent accidental mating of devices with a higher current draw than the receptacle can support.

NEMA 1-15 ungrounded (Type A) 

NEMA-1 plugs have two parallel blades and are rated 15 A at 125 volts. They provide no ground connection but will fit a grounding NEMA 5-15 receptacle. Early versions were not polarised, but most plugs are polarised today via a wider neutral blade. (Unpolarised AC adaptors are a common exception.)

Harvey Hubbell patented a parallel blade plug in 1913, where the blades were equal width. In 1916 Hubbell received a patent for a polarised version where one blade was both longer and wider than the other, in the polarised version of NEMA 1-15, introduced in the 1950s, both blades are the same length, only the width varies.

Ungrounded NEMA-1 outlets are not permitted in new construction in the United States and Canada, but can still be found in older buildings.

NEMA 5-15 grounded (Type B) 

The NEMA 5-15 plug has two flat parallel blades like NEMA 1-15, and a ground (earth) pin. It is rated 15 A at 125 volts. The ground pin is longer than the line and neutral blades, such that an inserted plug connects to ground before power. Both current-carrying blades on grounding plugs are normally narrow, since the ground pin enforces polarity. This socket is recommended in IEC standard 60906-2 for 120-volt 60 Hz installations.

The National Electrical Contractors Association's National Electrical Installation Standards (NECA 130-2010) recommends that sockets are mounted with the ground hole up, such that a falling object on a partially inserted connector contacts the ground pin first. However, the inverted orientation (with ground pin downwards) is more commonly used.

Tamper-resistant sockets may be required in new residential construction, with shutters on the power blade sockets to prevent contact by objects inserted into the socket.

In stage lighting, this connector is sometimes known as PBG for Parallel Blade with Ground, Edison or Hubbell, the name of a common manufacturer.

NEMA 5-20 

The NEMA 5-20 AP variant has blades perpendicular to each other. The receptacle has a T-slot for the neutral blade which accepts either 15 A parallel-blade plugs or 20 A plugs.

Other NEMA types
30- and 50-amp rated sockets are often used for high-current appliances such as clothes dryers and electric stoves.

JIS C 8303, Class II unearthed

The Japanese plug and socket appear physically identical to NEMA 1-15. The Japanese system incorporates stricter dimensional requirements for the plug housing, different marking requirements—for example, the ground side of the Alexa smart plug is marked with a clearly identifiable "N"—and mandatory testing and approval by METI or JIS.

Older Japanese sockets and multi-plug adaptors are unpolarised—the slots in the sockets are the same size—and will accept only unpolarised plugs. Japanese plugs generally fit into most North American sockets without modification, but polarised North American plugs may require adaptors or replacement non-polarised plugs to connect to older Japanese sockets. In Japan the voltage is 100 V, and the frequency is either 50 Hz (East Japan) or 60 Hz (West Japan) depending on whether the customer is located on the Osaka or Tokyo grid. Therefore, some North American devices which can be physically plugged into Japanese sockets may not function properly.

JIS C 8303, Class I earthed 
Japan also uses a grounded plug similar to the North American NEMA 5-15. However, it is less common than its NEMA 1-15 equivalent. Since 2005, new Japanese homes are required to have class I grounded sockets for connecting domestic appliances. This rule does not apply for sockets not intended to be used for domestic appliances, but it is strongly advised to have class I sockets throughout the home.

Soviet standard GOST 7396 C 1 unearthed 

This Soviet plug, still sometimes used in the region, has pin dimensions and spacing equal to the Europlug, but lacks the insulation sleeves. Unlike the Europlug, it is rated 6 A. It has a round body like the European CEE 7/2 or flat body with a round base like CEE 7/17. The round base has no notches. The pins are parallel and do not converge. The body is made of fire-resistant thermoset plastic. The corresponding 6 A socket accepts the Europlug, but not others as the 4.5 mm holes are too small to accept the 4.8 mm pins of CEE 7/4, CEE 7/6 or CEE 7/7 plugs.

There were also moulded rubber plugs available for devices up to 16 A similar to CEE 7/17, but with a round base without any notches. They could be altered to fit a CEE 7/5 or CEE 7/3 socket by cutting notches with a sharp knife.

Swiss SN 441011 (Type J)

The Swiss standard, also used in Liechtenstein, is SN 441011 (until 2019 SN SEV 1011) Plugs and socket-outlets for household and similar purposes. The standard defines a hierarchical system of plugs and sockets with two, three and five pins, and 10 A or 16 A ratings. Sockets will accept plugs with the same or fewer pins and the same or lower ratings.

The standard also includes three-phase devices rated at 250 V (phase-to-neutral) / 440 V (phase-to-phase).

The Swiss standard does not require the use of child protective shutters.

The Swiss standard was first described in 1959.

10 A plugs and sockets (Type J)
SEV 1011 defines a "Type 1x" series of 10 A plugs and sockets.

The type 11 plug is unearthed, with two 4 mm diameter round pins spaced 19 mm apart. The type 12 plug adds a central 4 mm diameter round earth pin, offset by 5 mm.

The type 12 socket has no recess, while the type 13 socket is recessed. Both sockets will accept type 11 and type 12 plugs, and also the 2.5 A Europlug.

Earlier type 11 & 12 plugs had line and neutral pins without sleeved pins, which present a shock hazard when partially inserted into non-recessed sockets.

The IEC type J designation refers to SEV 1011's type 12 plugs and type 13 sockets.

Unique to Switzerland is a three-phase power socket compatible with single-phase plugs:

The type 15 plug has three round pins, of the same dimensions as type 12, plus two smaller flat rectangular pins for two additional power phases. The type 15 socket is recessed, and has five openings (three round and two flat rectangular). It will accept plugs of types 11, 12, 15 and the Europlug.

16 A plugs and sockets
SEV 1011 also defines a "Type 2x" series of 16 A plugs and sockets. These are the same as their 10 A "Type 1x" counterparts, but replace the round pins with 4 mm × 5 mm rectangular pins. The sockets will accept "Type  1x" plugs.

The unearthed type 21 plug has two rectangular pins, with centres 19 mm apart. The type 23 plug adds a central rectangular earth pin, offset by 5 mm.

The recessed type 23 socket will accept plugs of types 11, 12, 21, 23 and the Europlug.

Again, the three-phase power socket is compatible with single-phase plugs, either of 10 A or 16 A ratings:

The type 25 plug has three rectangular pins of the same dimensions as type 23, plus two rectangular pins of the same dimensions as type 15. The corresponding type 25 socket is recessed and will accept plugs of types 11, 12, 15, 21, 23, 25 and the Europlug.

Adaptors etc.
A 2012 appendix to SEV 1011:2009, SN SEV 1011:2009/A1:2012 Plugs and socket-outlets for household and similar purposes – A1: Multiway and intermediate adaptors, cord sets, cord extension sets, travel adaptors and fixed adaptors defines the requirements applicable to multiway and intermediate adaptors, cord sets, cord extension sets, and travel and fixed adaptors, it covers the electrical safety and user requirements, including the prohibition of stacking (the connection of one adaptor to another). Non-conforming products must be withdrawn from the Swiss market before the end of 2018.

Pictures

Thai three-pin plug TIS 166-2549 (Type O)

Thai Industrial Standard (TIS) 166-2547 and its subsequent update TIS 166-2549 replaced prior standards which were based on NEMA 1-15 and 5-15, as Thailand uses 220 V electricity. The plug has two round power pins 4.8 mm in diameter and 19 mm in length, insulated for 10 mm and spaced 19 mm apart, with an earthing pin of the same diameter and 21.4 mm in length, located 11.89 mm from the line connecting the two power pins. The earth pin spacing corresponds to that of NEMA 5 and provides compatibility with prior hybrid three-pin sockets, which accept NEMA 1-15, NEMA 5-15 and Europlugs, all of which have been variably used in Thailand. The hybrid socket is also defined in TIS 166-2547, in addition to a plain three-round-pin socket, with plans to replace the former and phase out support for NEMA-compatible plugs. Sockets are polarised (as in NEMA 5-15). The plug is similar to, but not interchangeable with, the Israeli SI32 plug. The Thai plug is designated as "Type O" at IEC World Plugs.

Comparison of standard types

Adaptors

Travel adapters
Adapters between standards are not included in the standards, and as a result they have no formal quality criteria defined. Physical compatibility does not ensure that the appliance and socket match in frequency or voltage. Adaptors allow travellers to connect devices to foreign sockets, but do not change voltage or frequency. A voltage converter is required for electrical compatibility in places with a different voltage than the device is designed for. Mismatch in frequency between supply and appliances may still cause problems even at the correct voltage.

Multisocket adaptors

Multisocket adaptors allow the connection of two or more plugs to a single socket. They are manufactured in various configurations, depending on the country and the region in which they are used, with various ratings. In Europe for example, they are called double or triple adaptors, and transform one socket into a multiple socket. This allows connecting more than one electrical consumer item to one single socket and is mainly used for low power devices (TV sets, table lamps, computers, etc.). They are usually rated at 6 A 250 V, 10 A 250 V, or 16 A 250 V. This is the general rating of the adaptor, and indicates the maximum total load in amps, regardless of the number of sockets used (for example, if a 16 A 250 V adapter has four sockets, it would be fine to plug four different devices into it that each consume 2A as this represents a total load of only 8A, whereas if only two devices were plugged into it that each consumed 10A, the combined 20A load would overload the circuit). In some countries these adaptors are banned and are not available in shops, as they may lead to fires due to overloading them. Adaptors can be made with ceramic, Bakelite, or other plastic bodies.

Unusual types

Lampholder plug
A lampholder plug fits into a light socket in place of a light bulb to connect appliances to lighting circuits. Where a lower rate was applied to electric power used for lighting circuits, lampholder plugs enabled the consumers to reduce their electricity costs. Lampholder plugs are rarely fused. Edison screw lampholder adaptors (for NEMA 1-15 plugs) are still commonly used in the Americas.

Soviet adaptor plugs

Some appliances sold in the Soviet Union had a flat unearthed plug with an additional pass-through socket on the top, allowing a stacked arrangement of plugs. The usual Soviet apartment of the 1960s had very few sockets, so this design was very useful, but somewhat unsafe; the brass cylinders of the secondary socket were uncovered at the ends (to allow them to be unscrewed easily), recessed by only 3 mm, and provided bad contact because they relied on the secondary plug's bisected expanding pins. The pins of the secondary plug (which lacked insulation sleeves) could not be inserted into the cylindrical sockets completely, leaving a 5 mm gap between the primary and secondary plugs. The adaptors were mostly used for low power appliances (for example, connecting both a table lamp and a radio to a socket).

UK Walsall Gauge plug 

Unlike the standard BS 1363 plugs found in the UK, the earth pin is on a horizontal axis and the live and neutral pins on a vertical axis. This style of plug/socket was used by university laboratories (from batteries) and the BBC, and is still in use on parts of the London Underground for 110VAC voltage supply. In the 1960s they were used for 240VDC in the Power laboratory of the Electrical Engineering department of what was then University College, Cardiff. Power was supplied by the public 240VDC mains which remained available in addition to the 240VAC mains until circa 1969, and thereafter from in-house rectifiers. They were also used in the Ministry of Defence Main Building on circuits powered from the standby generators to stop staff from plugging in unauthorised devices. They were also known to be used in some British Rail offices for the same reason.

Italian BTicino brand Magic security connector

The Italian manufacturer BTicino in the 1960s introduced an alternative to the Europlug or CEI 23-16 connectors then in use. The socket is rectangular, with lateral key pins and indentations to maintain polarisation, and to prevent insertion of a plug with different current ratings. Three single-phase general purpose connectors were rated 10 A, 16 A and 20 A; and a three-phase industrial connector rated 10 A; all of them have different key-pin positioning so plugs and sockets cannot be mismatched. The socket is closed by a safety lid (bearing the word ‘'Magic'’ on it) which can be opened only with an even pressure on its surface, thus preventing the insertion of objects (except the plug itself) inside the socket. The contacts are positioned on both sides of the plug; the plug is energised only when it is inserted fully into the socket.

The system is not compatible with Italian CEI plugs, nor with Europlugs. Appliances were never sold fitted with these security plugs, and the use of adaptors would defeat the safety features, so the supplied plugs had to be cut off and replaced with the security connector. Even so, the Magic security system had some success at first because its enhanced safety features appealed to customers; standard connectors of the day were considered not safe enough. The decline of the system occurred when safety lids similar to the Magic type were developed for standard sockets.

In Italy, the system was never definitively abandoned. Though very rarely seen today, it is still marked as available in BTicino’s catalogue, (except for the three-phase version, which stopped being produced in July 2011).

In Chile, 10 A Magic connectors are commonly used for computer/laboratory power networks, as well as for communications or data equipment. This allows delicate electronics equipment to be connected to an independent circuit breaker, usually including a surge protector or an uninterruptible power supply backup. The different style of plug makes it more difficult for office workers to connect computer equipment to a standard unprotected power line, or to overload the UPS by connecting other office appliances.

In Iceland, Magic plugs were widely used in homes and businesses alongside Europlug and Schuko installations. Their installation in new homes was still quite common even in the late 1980s.

Single phase electric stove plugs and sockets

The plugs and sockets used to power electric stoves from a single-phase line have to be rated for greater current values than those used with three-phase supply because all the power has to be transferred through two contacts, not three. If not hardwired to the supply, electric stoves may be connected to the mains with an appropriate high power connector. Some countries do not have wiring regulations for single-phase electric stoves. In Russia, an electric stove can often be seen connected with a 25 or 32 A connector.

In Norway and parts of Sweden a 25 A grounded connector, rectangular shaped with rounded corners, is used for single phase stoves. The connector has three rectangular pins in a row, with the grounding pin longer than other two. The corresponding socket is recessed to prevent shocks. The Norwegian standard is NEK 502:2005 – standard sheet X (socket) and sheet XI (plug). They are also known as the two pole and earth variants of CEE 7/10 (socket) and CEE 7/11 (plug).

See also

 DC connector
 History of AC power plugs and sockets
 IEC 60309 high-power industrial and polyphase connectors
 IEC 60320 appliance connectors
 Industrial and multiphase power plugs and sockets
 Mains electricity
 Mains electricity by country lists voltage, frequency, and connector types for over 200 countries
 Perilex 
 Plug load
 Polyphase system
 Smart plug
 Stage pin connector
 Anderson Powerpole

References

External links

 Digital Museum of Plugs and Sockets (comprehensive collection of plugs and sockets)
 Glossary of standards terms
 Edison thread

Electrical standards
Electrical wiring
Mains power connectors